Dewi Sandra Killick or better known as Dewi Sandra (born 3 April 1980) is a Brazilian-born Indonesian singer, actress, dancer and model of mixed English and Betawi descent.

Biography
Sandra was born in Brazil on 3 April 1980. She is of mixed heritage; her mother, Hajjah Prihartini, was Betawi and her father, John George Killick, was a British national. As a child, she was overweight; this led her to receive the nickname "Miss Piggy". However, she lost weight and began modeling in her teens, later recording the compilation album Menari-Nari (Dance) with her fellow models.

She released her first solo album, Kurasakan (I Feel), in 1998 to lukewarm reception. Critics objected that she was only "selling a pretty face". She then received further vocal training, after which she released Tak Ingin Lagi (Don't Want It Anymore), which was received better.

Her next album, Kuakui (I Admit), was released in 2004 after three years production. The following album, 2007's Star, was more experimental. It mixed uptempo beats on some tracks with slow ballads.

The following year, Sandra became the host of the fifth season of Indonesian Idol. She also turned to acting, starring in several teen films.

Sandra released her fifth album, Wanita (Woman), not long after her divorce in 2009. A single from the album, "Kapan Lagi Bilang I Love You" ("When Will You Say I Love You Again"), was released in April, with the album following in October. One of the songs, "Satu Untuk Selamanya", discussed how happy she had been with Glenn Fredly at the beginning of their relationship.

In 2011 she was cast in her first sinetron (Indonesian soap opera), Nada Cinta (Tones of Love), as a singing teacher. She expressed surprise at the rushed nature of the filming.

Style
Her first four albums were categorized with "bouncy R&B songs infused with a joyful mood". However, her fifth album, Wanita, featured more melancholic melodies.

Personal life
She married actor Surya Saputra in the early 2000s; they divorced in 2005. She then married singer Glenn Fredly. He proposed to her at the National Monument and they were married in Bali on her 26th birthday. But that interfaith marriage, does not last long Fredly initiated divorce proceedings in April 2009. On 11 December 2011 Dewi Sandra married for third time, to Agus Rahman.

She enjoys reading, becoming addicted to it after being introduced to the Harry Potter series as a teenager. She also enjoys watching movies and travelling.

Sandra admires Madonna, Oprah Winfrey, and Nelson Mandela; Madonna and Oprah for being strong, emancipated women, and Mandela for being a dedicated leader.

Awards and nominations

Discography
Hangatnya Cinta (1995)
Kurasakan (I Feel; 1998)
Tak Ingin Lagi (Don't Want It Anymore; 2000)
Kuakui (I Admit; 2004)
Star (2007)
Wanita (Woman; 2009)

References
Footnotes

Bibliography

External links

1980 births
Indo people
Betawi people
Indonesian people of British descent
Indonesian female models
21st-century Indonesian women singers
Living people
20th-century Indonesian women singers
Indonesian Muslims
Anugerah Musik Indonesia winners